Roni Allén (born October 10, 1998) is a Finnish professional ice hockey defenseman who is currently playing for HC TPS of the Liiga.

Playing career
Allén has played as a youth from the age of 13 at the Junior C level with JYP. He made his professional Liiga debut with JYP during the 2017–18 season, appearing on the blueline in 8 scoreless games. He also appeared in 5 Champions Hockey League games, helping JYP as the first non Swedish club to capture the title.

On March 13, 2018, Allén as a developing two-way defenseman was signed to a three-year contract extension with JYP.

Career statistics

Awards and honours

References

External links

1998 births
Living people
Finnish ice hockey defencemen
JYP-Akatemia players
JYP Jyväskylä players
KeuPa HT players
Rovaniemen Kiekko players
People from Rovaniemi
Sportspeople from Lapland (Finland)
HC TPS players
TuTo players
21st-century Finnish people